Joan of Lusignan (1260 – 13 April 1323) was a French noblewoman. She succeeded her uncle, Guy de la Marche, Knight, sometime in the period, 1310/13, as Lady of Couche and Peyrat, but not as Countess of La Marche since after her sister, Yolande's death, it was annexed by Philip IV of France and given as an appanage to Philip's son Charles the Fair. Previously, in 1308, following the death of her brother Guy (or Guiard), Jeanne and her sister Isabelle, as co-heiresses, had sold the county of Angoulême to the King.

She was married twice. Her first husband was Bernard Ezi III, Lord of Albret, by whom she had two daughters. By her second husband Sir Piers de Geneville, she had another three daughters; the eldest of whom was Joan de Geneville, 2nd Baroness Geneville, wife of Roger Mortimer, 1st Earl of March, the de facto ruler of England from 1327 to 1330.

She is sometimes referred to as Jeanne of Lusignan.

Family 

Joan was a younger daughter of Hugh XII of Lusignan, Count of La Marche and Angoulême, lord of Lusignan and Fougères, and Jeanne de Fougères.

Her grandfather, Hugh XI of Lusignan, was the half-brother of King Henry III of England.

Marriages 
Joan married firstly Bernard Ezi III, Lord of Albret, by whom she had two daughters: 

 Mathe, Dame d'Albret (died 1283)
 Isabelle, Dame d'Albret (died 1 December 1294), married Bernard VI, Count of Armagnac, as his first wife. Their marriage was childless.

After the death of her first husband on 24 December 1280, Joan married secondly before 11 Oct. 1283 (date of charter), Sir Piers de Geneville, of Trim and Ludlow Castle (1256 – before June 1292), by whom she had another three daughters: 

 Joan de Geneville (2 February 1286 – 19 October 1356), in 1301 married  Roger de Mortimer, 1st Earl of March (d. 29 November 1330), by whom she had twelve children.
 Maud de Geneville, a nun at Aconbury Priory
 Beatrice de Geneville, a nun at Aconbury Priory

Death and legacy
Joan died 13 April 1323 at the age of 63, and was buried at the Abbaye de Valence.

Ancestry

References

 Medieval Lands "Angoulême"
 Paul Theroff
Europaseische Stammtafeln "Lusignan".

1260 births
1323 deaths
House of Lusignan
Lusignan, Lady of, Jeanne
13th-century French people
14th-century French people
13th-century French women
14th-century French women
People from Angoulême
14th-century women rulers
13th-century women rulers